The CFM Air Dardo is an Italian ultralight aircraft that was designed by CFM Air of Cirié, introduced at the AERO Friedrichshafen show in 2014.

Design and development
The Dardo was designed by CFM Air, a company usually noted for its contract aerospace development and prototyping of projects, with the intention of selling the design for production by another company. CFM Air has also not ruled out producing the aircraft itself, if needed.

The prototype was first flown in July 2014.

The Dardo features a cantilever low-wing, an enclosed cockpit with two-seats-in-side-by-side configuration under a bubble canopy, retractable tricycle landing gear and a single engine in tractor configuration.

The aircraft is made all composite materials. Standard engines intended for use are the  Rotax 912ULS and the  MW-Fly four-stroke powerplants. In 2015 a hybrid electric aircraft version was shown in Paris.

Specifications (Dardo)

References

External links

Dardo
2010s Italian ultralight aircraft
Single-engined tractor aircraft